State Route 107 (SR 107) is a  state highway in eastern Tennessee, United States. It begins at an intersection with Round Mountain Road south of Del Rio and ends at the North Carolina state line east of Unicoi, where it becomes NC 226.

It travels through the incorporated municipalities of Greeneville, Tusculum, Erwin and Unicoi, and the communities of Del Rio, South Greene, Horse Creek, South Central, Lamar, Embreeville and Limestone Cove.

Route description

Cocke County
SR 107 begins as a secondary highway in Cocke County near the North Carolina border at an intersection with Ground Squirrel Road and Round Mountain Road, where the road continues as Round Mountain Road in North Carolina. SR 107 goes northwest through narrow valley and mountains to enter Del Rio, where it crosses a bridge over the French Broad River and becomes concurrent with US 25/US 70/SR 9. They then go east to leave Del Rio and parallel the river to an intersection where SR 107 splits off and goes north. The highway then passes through a rugged and remote part of the Cherokee National Forest before crossing into Greene County.

Greene County
SR 107 then levels out and passes through Houston Valley before entering South Greene and becoming concurrent with SR 70. They then turn northwest and have an intersection with SR 351 and SR-107 Cutoff. The highway then leaves South Greene and crosses over the Nolichucky River just yards from the historic Nolichucky Dam and Davy Crockett Lake. SR 70/SR 107 then continue north into Greeneville where they come to an intersection with US 321/SR 35, where SR 107 leaves SR 70 to become concurrent with US 321/SR 35 to enter downtown. They then have a short concurrency with SR 350 before becoming concurrent US 11E Bus. They continue north through downtown before US 321/SR 35 splits off and goes north while US 11E Bus/SR 107 continue through town before coming to an intersection with US 11E/US 321/SR 34, where US 11E Bus ends and SR 107 becomes concurrent with that highway as they enter the neighboring town of Tusculum. They then have an intersection with Erwin Highway (Former SR 107 through downtown) before bypassing downtown to the north. They then come to an intersection where SR 107 splits off and goes southeast, becoming a primary highway and leaving Tusculum. SR 107 then enters farmland, where it crosses another bridge over the Nolichucky River and has an intersection with SR 351/SR-107 Cutoff, where SR-107 Cutoff ends and SR 107 becomes concurrent with SR 351. SR 351 then turns north and SR 107 continues east to cross into Washington County.

Washington County
SR 107 then passes through South Central, where it has an intersection with SR 353, before continuing east, then northeast, paralleling the Nolichucky River. The highway then enters Lamar, where it becomes concurrent with SR 81, before leaving Lamar and crossing another bridge over the Nolichucky River, in the community of Embreeville, and crossing into Unicoi County.

Unicoi County
SR 107/SR 81 then pass through a set of mountains before entering Erwin, where they have an interchange with I-26/US 23/US 19W (Exit 37), where SR 81 ends and SR 107 becomes a secondary highway. The highway then enters downtown and then turns left to cross a new bridge over the rail road tracks before leaving downtown and continuing northeast after turning back onto its former alignment. SR 107 then passes through a major business district, where it has an intersection with SR 395 before having an intersection with Harris Hollow Road, which provides access to an interchange with I-26. SR 107 then leaves Erwin and continues northeast to the town of Unicoi, where it becomes concurrent with SR 173. The highway then winds its way between some mountains to enter Limestone Cove, where SR 173 splits off and goes north while SR 107 continues east to enter the Cherokee National Forest. The highway then becomes very curvy coming to the North Carolina state line, where SR 107 ends and continues east as NC 226.

Alternate names
State Route 107 bears the following names:
Houston Valley Road From the Cocke-Greene county line to SR 70.
Asheville Highway while concurrent with SR 70.
West, South & North Main Streets while concurrent with US 321.
Tusculum Boulevard while concurrent with US 11E Business.
East Andrew Johnson Highway while concurrent with US 11E/US 321.
Tusculum Bypass on the east side of Tusculum to intersection with Erwin Highway.
Erwin Highway from Tusculum Bypass to Greene-Washington County line.
Governor John Sevier Highway from Greene-Washington County line to junction with SR 81.
Highway 81 while concurrent with SR 81.
Jonesborough Road from Washington-Unicoi County line to North Main Avenue and Second Street intersection in Erwin.
North Main Avenue from Second Street to Dry Creek Road intersection.
Unicoi Drive from Dry Creek Road to SR 173.
Highway 107 from SR 173 to Tennessee-North Carolina state-line.

History
In Greene County, SR 107 formerly went through downtown Tusculum along Erwin Highway, it has since been rerouted along US Route 11E/US Route 321 and the "Tusculum Bypass" a five lane (four lanes and center turn lane) road on the east side of Tusculum, it becomes Erwin Highway on the southeast side of the city. The former alignment is now an Unsigned Business Route.

It Begins on the east side of Greeneville at US 11E/US 321 and travels through downtown Tusculum past Tusculum College and ends at mainline SR 107 on the southeast side of Tusculum.

Beginning in 2010 Improvements were made to SR 107's intersection with SR 351/State Route 107 Cutoff just south of the city of Tusculum in Greene County and a traffic signal was installed. The work was completed the following year.

In 2010, the City of Tusculum and the Tennessee Department of Transportation approved improvements to the Tusculum Bypass and Edens Road intersection. The work is said to start in 2014. The work was completed in late September 2014, with added guardrails and flashing beacons.

As of May 21, 2015, SR 107 was rerouted in Erwin from Jonesborough Road to an overpass that bypasses the railroad crossings on that road, in order to increase accessibility to Downtown Erwin.

State Route 107 Cutoff
State Route 107 Cutoff is a portion of
Tennessee State Route 351 and a cutoff route of State Route 107.

It begins at Tennessee State Routes 70 and 107 in the South Greene community and goes northeasterly and junctions with Tennessee State Route 350 about halfway through. It continues northeasterly to State Route 107 and ends.

Major intersections

References

Transportation in Cocke County, Tennessee
Transportation in Greene County, Tennessee
Transportation in Washington County, Tennessee
Transportation in Unicoi County, Tennessee
107
Unicoi County, Tennessee
Tusculum, Tennessee